Arizona Summer is a family film directed by Joey Travolta. The plot is about Brent Butler (Gemini Barnett), a wiser-than-his years youngster. A modern-day Tom Sawyer. The majority of the story takes place at a boys and girls camp owned and operated by Travers (Lee Majors), who has spent a lifetime of quietly helping adolescents become confident young adults. In addition to the full gamut of camp activities, adventures, practical jokes, and conflict resolution there is the underlying theme that bolsters the importance of a positive father-son relationship.

Cast
Gemini Barnett as Brent
Brent Blair as Jack
Christy Blair as Head Counselor
Brooke Burgstahler as Christy
Scott Clifton as Brooke
Greg Evigan as Rick
Morgan Fairchild as Debbie
Bug Hall as Scott
David Henrie as Bad
Lorenzo James Henrie as Jerry
Hoku as Shawn
Michelle Holgate as Donna
Scott Johnson as Matt
Jessica Kinsella as Sabrina
April Lunsford as Melissa
Lee Majors as Mr. Travers
Michael Margetis as Mumps
Bruce Nelson as Referee
Chelsea Staub as Carol
Shane Van Dyke as Mike
Michael Wayne as Ty
Tracy Wilkinson as Ms. Reed
Dillon Zrike as Logan

External links

American drama films
2003 drama films
2003 films
2004 drama films
2004 films
2000s English-language films
2000s American films